Mouma Das  (born 24 February 1984) is an Indian table tennis player. Born and brought up in Kolkata, West Bengal, she has represented India in international events since the early 2000s. Das has won multiple medals at the Commonwealth Games including a gold in the Women's Team Competition in 2018. She was awarded the Arjuna Award, India's second highest sporting honour in 2013 for her contributions to the sport.

Das participated in the 2004 Olympic Games where she competed in the singles table tennis competition; she made her second appearance at the event in the 2016 edition after a gap of 12 years. Das reached the quarterfinals of the women's doubles event at the 2017 World Table Tennis Championships partnering Manika Batra; the duo became the first Indian pair (and the first Indians in over 61 years) to do so. The pair also won the silver medal at the 2018 Commonwealth Games.She was awarded India's fourth highest civilian award the Padma Shri in 2021.

Career
Das made her first World Table Tennis Championship appearance in the year 1997, at Manchester, and went on to reach the third round before bowing out. She did not participate the following year, because of an injury. In the subsequent world meets, Das either represented India as a singles player or as the team member: Kuala Lumpur (2000), Osaka (2001), Paris (2003), Doha (2004), Bremen (2006), Zagreb (2007), Guangzhou (2008), Yokohama (2009), Moscow (2010), Rotterdam (2011), Dortmund (2012), Paris (2013), Suzhou (2015), Kuala Lumpur (2016), Düsseldorf (2017), Halmstad (2018) without missing any championships. She registered the highest caps at the Championships, with 17 appearances. Das and Thailand's Komwon Nanthana have both represented their country 17 times each, the maximum by any Asian in both sections.

Das won her 1st International Gold medal in 2nd Children of Asia International Sports Games'2000 in Yakutsk.

Mouma Das played more than 400 international matches against 75 different countries.
 
At the December 2015 Commonwealth Championships, Das claimed a silver in the singles event along with team medal and became the maximum Commonwealth medal winning Indian Table Tennis player.

Das qualified for the 2016 Rio Olympics at the Asian Qualification Tournament held in Hong Kong in April 2015. However, her appearance at the 2016 Olympics short-lived, as she lost to higher seeded Daniela Dodean of Romania in the first round of the women's individual event.

For the Indian table tennis fraternity, ITTF World Tours have never been easy. But things were very different this time in Olomouc, a city in Moravia, in the east of the Czech Republic. Mouma Das and Manika Batra, the new and heroic women's doubles pair of India, lifted their game by several notches to reach the semi-finals for the first time at an ITTF World Tour (Major).

Indian star table tennis duo of Mouma Das and Manika Batra reached a world ranking of 12 in the latest ITTF rankings which is the best among 28 Commonwealth countries that play the sport on the big stages.

In 2017 ITTF Challenge Spanish Open Indian pair of Manika Batra and Mouma Das, seeded second, went down to the top-seed Korean duo of Jihee Jeon and Haeun Yang 11–9, 6-11, 11–9, 9-11, 9–11 in a thrilling women doubles final.it was a creditable performance by the Indians who forced the issue to the last two points to become the first Indian women's pair to finish with the silver medal in an ITTF Challenge series. Later that year,  Das made her 50th Final in Annual Inter State & Senior National Table Tennis Championship in Ranchi; she also won gold medal in the team event, where she represented PSPB.

Das was a part of the Women's team that won the gold medal in the 2018 Commonwealth Games; the Indian team defeated Singapore in the final with a score of 3–1 to secure the first gold medal for the country in the event. Das won the women's doubles match partnering Madhurika Patkar to give India the lead in the tie. En route to the gold medal, the first by any nation other Singapore, India defeated the top seeded English team in semi-finals. Presently she is an employee of OIL (Oil India Ltd.).

Records and statistics

Top Records

Commonwealth Table Tennis

Following are finishes at the Commonwealth Table Tennis Championships and the Commonwealth Games.

Gold Hat-Trick in Annual Senior Table Tennis Championship

Indian Senior National Championships & National Games Individual Events

World Table Tennis Championship

See also 
 Sharath Kamal
 Poulomi Ghatak
 Shamini Kumaresan

References

External links 
 International Table Tennis Federation's profile
 
 

1984 births
Living people
Commonwealth Games silver medallists for India
Commonwealth Games bronze medallists for India
Commonwealth Games medallists in table tennis
Recipients of the Arjuna Award
Recipients of the Padma Shri in sports
Table tennis players at the 2010 Commonwealth Games
Olympic table tennis players of India
Table tennis players at the 2004 Summer Olympics
Table tennis players at the 2016 Summer Olympics
Table tennis players at the 2010 Asian Games
Table tennis players at the 2006 Asian Games
21st-century Indian women
21st-century Indian people
Table tennis players at the 2018 Commonwealth Games
Table tennis players at the 2018 Asian Games
Asian Games competitors for India
South Asian Games gold medalists for India
South Asian Games silver medalists for India
South Asian Games medalists in table tennis
Indian female table tennis players
Sportswomen from Kolkata
Racket sportspeople from Kolkata
Medallists at the 2010 Commonwealth Games
Medallists at the 2018 Commonwealth Games